A chastity belt is a locking item of clothing designed to prevent sexual intercourse or masturbation. Such belts were historically designed for women, ostensibly for the purpose of chastity, to protect women from rape or to dissuade women and their potential sexual partners from sexual temptation. Modern versions of the chastity belt are predominantly, but not exclusively, used in the BDSM community, and chastity belts are now designed for male wearers in addition to female wearers.

According to modern myths, the chastity belt was used as an anti-temptation device during the Crusades.  When the knight left for the Holy Lands on the Crusades, his Lady would wear a chastity belt to preserve her faithfulness to him.  However, there is no credible evidence that chastity belts existed before the 15th century (over a century after the last Middle Eastern Crusade), and their main period of apparent use falls within the Renaissance rather than the Middle Ages. Research into the history of the chastity belt suggests that they were not used until the 16th century, and then only rather rarely; they first became widely available in the form of 19th-century anti-masturbation medical devices.

Renaissance chastity belts were said to have had padded linings (to prevent large areas of metal from coming into direct prolonged contact with the skin), and these had to be changed fairly frequently, so that such belts were not practical for uninterrupted long-term wear. Uninterrupted long-term wear could have caused genitourinary infection, abrasive wounds, sepsis and eventual death.

Historical usage

Gregory the Great, Alcuin of York, Bernard of Clairvaux, and Nicholas Gorranus all made passing references to "chastity belts" within their exhortatory and public discourses, but meant this in a figurative or metaphorical sense within their historical context.

The first detailed actual mention of what could be interpreted as "chastity belts" in the West is in Konrad Kyeser von Eichstätt's Bellifortis (1405), which describes the military technology of the era. The book includes a drawing that is accompanied by the Latin text: "Est florentinarum hoc bracile dominarum ferreum et durum ab antea sic reseratum." ("These are hard iron breeches of Florentine women which are closed at the front.") The belt in this drawing is described by Dingwall as "both clumsy and heavy", having "little in common with the later models which served the same use". The Bellifortis account is not supported by any additional concrete evidence or corroborating documents. Polidoro argues that Kyeser's references are meant to be humorous or ironic, and that Dingwall's accounts of the use of chastity belts by a few rich men in the 16th and 17th centuries to ensure the faithfulness of their often much younger wives should be treated critically, because of the absence of actual artefacts of this nature from the historical period in question, and his lack of access to more detailed contemporary historical records.

In 1889, a leather-and-iron belt was found by Anton Pachinger—a German collector of antiquities—in Linz, Austria, in a grave on a skeleton of a young woman.  The woman was reportedly buried in the 16th century.  Pachinger, however, could not find any record of the woman's burial in the town archives.  The belt itself, along with most of the rest of Pachinger's collection, has been lost.

Two belts have been exhibited at the Musée de Cluny in Paris. The first, a simple velvet-covered hoop and plate of iron, was supposedly worn by Catherine de' Medici. The other—said to have been worn by Anne of Austria—is a hinged pair of plates held about the waist by metal straps, featuring intricately etched figures of Adam and Eve. There are other such belts at the Germanisches Nationalmuseum in Nuremberg and the British Museum in London.  Most have been removed from public display to avoid any further embarrassment because the authenticity of these belts as medieval devices has since been called into question. Many contemporary historians accept that these alleged "artifacts" date from the 19th century, and are thus inauthentic.

From the 18th century until the 1930s, masturbation was widely regarded as harmful in Western medicine. Numerous mentions can be found in medical journals of the time of the use of chastity belt-like devices to prevent masturbation in female children and adolescents, as well as women. Many designs for anti-masturbation devices were filed in the US Patent Office until the early 1930s, when masturbation was no longer deemed to be the cause of mental health problems.

Furthermore, some 19th-century working women may have used chastity belts for protective reasons, as a "rape shield" to obstruct sexual assault from predatory bosses or male colleagues; the belts were not worn for a long time uninterruptedly, however, since sanitary and hygiene reasons prevented this before the modern invention of stainless-steel belts.

Modern usage

BDSM

Chastity belts are sometimes used in BDSM play in consensual relationships.  They are a means for the wearer to surrender control over their sexual behavior either for sexual play, or as a long-term method of preventing infidelity or masturbation.  They range from simple leather or plastic toys commonly sold by adult stores to expensive high-security stainless steel devices made by a handful of specialist firms, including My-Steel, Neosteel, and Latowski in Germany, and Carrara Designs in Belgium.   The internet has significantly increased the number of people using chastity devices, with internet advertisements and amateur erotic content sites often serving as the means of discovery of chastity devices and their use. Similarly, the internet has allowed consumers to acquire devices easier, faster, anonymously, and from a wider range of manufacturers and retailers. Simultaneously, the internet has provided a private avenue for subcultures dedicated to their usage, fostering the culture and allowing individuals with interests in chastity to connect with one another, both on the internet and in-person. 

Although there exists a historical association of chastity belts with women, worldwide purchasing demand for male chastity belts is reportedly far higher than purchasing demand for female chastity devices.  As a consequence, the male chastity devices market offers more options and diversity compared to what is available for female chastity devices.  Among male chastity devices, "cock-and-ball" trap devices are the most popular, followed by typically more secure full belt (around-the-waist) style devices.

Films and TV
In Robin Hood: Men in Tights, Maid Marian (portrayed by Amy Yasbeck) has a silver-colored Everlast chastity belt revealed by the Sheriff.
In the Korean film The Cage by Lior Shamriz, the protagonist Nick (Kim Wonmok) flees his boss (Won Tae-hee) and crosses the border wearing a pink chastity device.
Meet the Spartans features a scene where Margo (portrayed by Carmen Electra) comes in a golden chastity belt concealed by her dress when she encounters Leonidas for the first time.
The Love Guru: Maurice Pitka (portrayed by Mike Myers) is given a metallic chastity belt at 12 years old with a large metallic elephant head that makes a trumpeting noise when exposed. It clanks and makes a pinging noise when he gets an erection and does not protect his genitalia from pain.
"Stoke Me a Clipper", the second episode the seventh series of Red Dwarf, has Dave Lister (portrayed by Craig Charles) utilize cheat codes to remove the chastity belt of the Queen of Camelot in a medieval fantasy game.
"Mad Max: Fury Road": The Five Wives are seen removing their chastity belts, once they have escaped from Immortan Joe and the Citadel.

Other occurrences
In 1981, while California State Senator John G. Schmitz was leading hearings on outlawing abortion, Gloria Allred presented him with a chastity belt. Schmitz retaliated in a press release, calling her a "slick butch lawyeress." She sued him for libel, and eventually secured a settlement of $20,000 and an apology.

In 1998, racial riots against the ethnic Chinese in West Java prompted the production and sale of "anti-rape corsets".  These were Florentine-type belts of imitation leather-covered plastic, fastened with a combination lock.  The belts had a solid crotch strap without holes, and were intended only for brief outings.

In April 2002, the Uwe Koetter Jewellers company of Cape Town, South Africa, completed and delivered a diamond and pearl-encrusted chastity belt made of gold to a British customer.  The belt reportedly cost R160,000 and was a wedding gift from a husband-to-be for his bride to wear at their wedding.

On February 6, 2004, USA Today reported that at Athens airport in Greece, a woman's steel chastity belt had triggered a security alarm at the metal detector.  The woman explained that her husband had forced her to wear the device to prevent an extramarital affair while she was on vacation in Greece. She was allowed to continue her flight to London on the pilot's authority. The incident was said to have happened just before Christmas in 2003.

In November 2006, photographs of Lucio Valentini's hand-wrought iron chastity belts were published in newspapers including the Seoul Times, and CRI Online.  Although Valentini's company, MedioEvo, claims that their chastity belts' designs are from the Middle Ages on their website, a company spokesperson acknowledged that there is no proof that devices such as these were actually used.

In 2007, the Asian Human Rights Commission reported that women were being forced to wear chastity belts in the Indian state of Rajasthan.

In 2008, masseuses in Batu, Indonesia were required to wear belts with a lock and key during working hours, to prevent prostitution.

On February 8, 2010, AOL News reported that Dexter Blanch, a dog breeder from Louisiana, introduced a chastity belt for dogs, called PABS (Pet Anti-Breeding System). It is made of polypropylene and uses an eight-buckle locking system and a washable mesh pad to prevent intercourse in female dogs. Dr. Kathleen Makolinski, director of veterinary outreach at the ASPCA, commented that "For the majority of animals, spaying and neutering remains the most beneficial option". While this may be true for dogs being helped by rescues and humane societies, the American Kennel Club subsequently changed its policy regarding pediatric spaying or neutering. Following the research published by UC Davis, the American Kennel Club (AKC) now says that the owner of large breed dogs will have a healthier, longer lived dog if the pet owner would wait until the dog is of appropriate age before spaying or neutering.

On September 19, 2012, China People's Daily reported that a man in his 50s, naked except for a homemade chastity belt, appeared with a pair of banners in Changchun World Sculpture Park in Jilin province in China, seeking a wife. He stated that he wore the chastity belt to symbolize fidelity to his future wife.

See also
 Confraternity of the Cord of Saint Thomas
 Erotic sexual denial
 Modesty
 Sexual abstinence

References

Notes

Sources

 Bonneau, Alcide (1892) Padlocks and Girdles of Chastity: An historical and descriptive notice. Paris: Isidore Lideux. . (Reprinted in 1932 and later by New York:  Golden Hind Press and, New York:  Big Dollar Books, and others.) Translation of Les cadenas et ceintures de chasteté. (The first half of the book is a dubious historical overview of chastity belts and their use by Greeks, Romans and others.  The second half of the book is titled "Speech of Monsieur Freydier's on behalf of Mademoiselle Marie Lajon versus Sieur Pierre Berlhe, prisoner of the Court", in which Mlle. Lajon's counsel argues to have the Court order a chastity belt removed from her.)

Further reading
Classen, Albrecht: The Medieval Chastity Belt: A Myth-Making Process (New Middle Ages): Palgrave Macmillan: 2007.
Dingwall, Eric John: The Girdle of Chastity: A Medico-Historical Study: London: Routledge and Sons: 1931.
Polidoro, Massimo: "The Myth of Chastity Belts": Skeptical Inquirer: 35: 5: September/October 2011: 27–28.

External links

 Chastity belt appearances in movies and TV

15th-century fashion
16th-century fashion
17th-century fashion
18th-century fashion
19th-century fashion
20th-century fashion
21st-century fashion
BDSM equipment
Physical restraint
Sexual abstinence
Undergarments
Opposition to masturbation